R. palustris may refer to:

 Radfordia palustris, a species of mite in the subgenus Hesperomyobia of the genus Radfordia.
 Rhodopseudomonas palustris, a gram-negative purple non-sulfur bacteria, notable for its ability to switch between four different modes of metabolism.
 Rorippa palustris is a flowering plant species in the mustard family known by the common names bog yellowcress and marsh cress.
 Rosa palustris (swamp rose), a shrub in the rose family native to much of eastern North America.

See also
 Palustris (disambiguation)